Operator assistance refers to a telephone call in which the calling party requires an operator to provide some form of assistance in completing the call. This may include telephone calls made from pay phones, calls placed station-to-station, person-to-person, collect, third number calls, calls billed to a credit card, and certain international calls which cannot be dialed directly. The telephone operator may also be able to assist with determining what kind of technical difficulties are occurring on a phone line, to verify whether a line is busy (Busy Line Verification, or BLV), or left off the hook, and break in on a phone line to request for the caller to clear the line for an incoming call (Busy Line Interruption, or BLI). The latter service is often utilized by emergency police. In addition, operators are often a first point of contact for the elderly wanting information on the current date and time.

Before the advent of emergency telephone numbers, operators identified and connected emergency calls to the correct emergency service. Directory assistance was also part of the operator's job.

Operator-assisted calls can be more expensive than direct dial calls. In the Bell System, an operator-assisted call had a 50% premium, but only on the initial period, usually three minutes.

A person-to-person call is an operator-assisted call in which the calling party requests to speak to a specific party and not simply to anyone who answers. The caller is not charged for the call unless the requested party is reached. This method was popular when telephone calls were relatively expensive. The alternative, in which the calling party agrees to talk to whoever answers the telephone, is known as station-to-station. Since the introduction of direct dial telephone service and the subsequent drop in the price of long distance telephone calls, person-to-person service has virtually disappeared. This service may still be used if the calling party wishes to remain anonymous to whoever answered, and wishes to have the operator initiate contact with the desired person.

A messenger call has been used in countries in which home telephones are unusual, and before the boom in cell phones in the early 21st century. A messenger, usually a boy, would go to the recipient's location to advise him or her to come to a central location at a designated time to receive a phone call.

An operator-assisted conference call is one in which the conference call is managed by an operator. The telephone operator will greet each call participant, gather specific information from each participant, introduce key speakers, and manage questions and answers, all from the telephone.

A third number call or third party call is an operator assisted telephone call that can be billed to the party other than the calling and called party. The operator calls the third number for the party to accept the charges before the call can proceed.

Time and charges was a service often requested of the operator before a call begins. After completion of the call, the operator calls back and specifies the length of the call (in minutes) and the charge for the call. While it was used by guests in a residence or business to compensate the host for use of the phone, it was almost always requested by hotel switchboards so that they could bill the room occupant for the charges before the occupant checked out.  Modern telephone systems in hotels make this unnecessary, as the calls are rated automatically by the hotel or by a service provider the hotel has contracted with. (Hotels often contract with resellers that charge unusually high rates, with the profit shared between the reseller and the hotel, thus helping the hotel defray the cost of the telephone system.)

List of active operator assistance numbers 

 Australia: 1234
 Hong Kong: 10010 (national), 10013 (international)

 United Kingdom: 100 (national), 155 (international)

List of historical/withdrawn operator assistance numbers 

 Ireland: 10 (national), 114 (international). Service withdrawn in 2007.

 North America (North American Numbering Plan): 0 (local), 01 (national non-local), 011 (international)
()

See also
 Long-distance operator

Telephone services
Assistance